Barbara Marie Nickerauer (December 10, 1928 – October 5, 1976), known professionally as Barbara Nichols, was an American actress who often played brassy or comic roles in films in the 1950s and 1960s.

Early life and career
Nichols was born Barbara Marie Nickerauer to George and Julia Nickerauer and was raised in Queens, New York. 

Early in her career, Nichols was a showgirl when a club owner offered her a much higher salary to become a striptease performer. She declined the offer, keeping her focus on becoming an actress. She began modeling for cheesecake magazines in the late 1940s and eventually was considered a minor rival to Marilyn Monroe. On Broadway, she appeared in the 1952 revival of Pal Joey (she also appeared in the 1957 film version) and in Let It Ride (1961). In the mid 1950s, she moved to Hollywood and began appearing in showy supporting roles in A-films, such as Miracle in the Rain (1956), The King and Four Queens (1956), The Naked and the Dead (1958), The Pajama Game (1957), Sweet Smell of Success (1957), That Kind of Woman (1958), and Where the Boys Are (1960), with high profile actors, including Clark Gable, Susan Hayward, Sophia Loren, and Doris Day. One of her few starring roles was in the 1965 science-fiction film The Human Duplicators.  Her final film was Won Ton Ton, the Dog Who Saved Hollywood in 1976.

Nichols was also a frequent guest star on many television series, including It's a Great Life, The Jack Benny Television Show, The Twilight Zone (in the episode "Twenty Two"), The Untouchables, The Travels of Jaimie McPheeters, Going My Way, Batman (episodes 35 and 36), Hawaii Five-O, Green Acres and The Beverly Hillbillies.

Death
Nichols died on October 5, 1976, at Cedars-Sinai Medical Center in Los Angeles from liver failure due to complications of a damaged spleen and liver reportedly sustained in separate  automobile accidents many years earlier. She is interred at Pinelawn Memorial Park in Farmingdale, New York.

Filmography

References

External links

 
 
 
 

1928 births
1976 deaths
20th-century American actresses
Actresses from New York City
American female models
American film actresses
American musical theatre actresses
American stage actresses
American television actresses
Burials in New York (state)
Deaths from liver failure
People from Queens, New York
20th-century American singers
20th-century American women singers